The Government of Haryana, also known as the State Government of Haryana, or locally as the State Government, is the supreme governing authority of the Indian state of Haryana and its 22 districts. It consists of an executive, ceremonially led by the Governor of Haryana and otherwise by the Chief Minister, a judiciary, and a legislative branch.

Branches of government

Executive

The head of state of Haryana is the Governor, appointed by the President of India on the advice of the central government. His or her post is largely ceremonial. The Chief Minister is the head of government and is vested with most of the executive powers to run the 22 districts of Haryana across its six divisions.

Legislative
Chandigarh is the capital of Haryana and houses the Haryana Vidhan Sabha (Legislative Assembly) and the secretariat. The city also serves as the capital of Punjab, and is a union territory of India.

The present Legislative Assembly of Haryana is unicameral, consisting of 90 members of the legislative assembly (MLAs). Its term is five years, unless dissolved earlier.

Judicial
The Punjab and Haryana High Court, located in Chandigarh, has jurisdiction over the whole state.

Government Schemes by Haryana Government

See also 
 Divisions of Haryana

References

External links
 Official website
 Haryana Kaushal Rozgar Nigam (HKRN Portal)